Ho un piano is the fifth studio album by Italian singer and pianist Raphael Gualazzi. It was released in Italy on 7 February 2020 through Sugar Music. The album peaked at number 34 on the Italian Albums Chart. The album includes the single "Carioca", which was Gualazzi's entry into the 70th edition of Italy's national Eurovision song selection competition, the Sanremo Music Festival 2020.

Singles
"Carioca" was released as the lead single from the album on 5 February 2020. The song peaked at number 33 on the Italian Singles Chart. The song took part in Sanremo Music Festival 2020, the 70th edition of Italy's national Eurovision song selection competition, where it placed 11th in the grand final.

Track listing

Charts

Release history

References

2020 albums
Raphael Gualazzi albums